Maryland Route 712 (MD 712) is a state highway in the U.S. state of Maryland.  Known as Forest Park Road, the state highway runs  from MD 235 north to an entrance to Naval Air Station Patuxent River (NAS Patuxent River) within Lexington Park in eastern St. Mary's County.  MD 712 was constructed in the mid-1940s as a military access project.

Route description

MD 712 begins at an intersection with MD 235 (Three Notch Road) on the southern edge of Lexington Park.  The roadway continues on the opposite side of MD 235 as county-maintained Hermanville Road.  MD 712 heads north as a two-lane undivided road through a forested area between residential subdivisions to the east and NAS Patuxent River to the west.  The state highway parallels the military base's perimeter road for much of its length.  Immediately after passing Pine Hill Run Road, the state highway reaches its northern terminus at an entrance to NAS Patuxent River.

History
MD 712 was constructed as a military access project during World War II.  The state highway was built as part of a  project to improve MD 235 between Jarboesville (now Lexington Park) and the community of Hermanville and provide access to the South Gate of NAS Patuxent River.  MD 712 was constructed in 1944 and 1945.

Junction list

See also

References

External links

MDRoads: MD 712

712
Maryland Route 712